Mira Jacob (b. January 5, 1973, in Albuquerque, New Mexico) is an American writer. She is the author of The Sleepwalker's Guide to Dancing (2014), a novel about a patriarch who starts talking to ghosts, and Good Talk (2019), a graphic memoir.

Education and career
Jacob earned her BA from Oberlin College in 1996. She earned her MFA from the New School for Social Research. 

Jacob is the founder of Pete's Reading Series, a reading series in Brooklyn. She is the author of The Sleepwalker's Guide to Dancing, a novel about a patriarch who starts talking to ghosts, and how his seeing spirits affects his family. The Sleepwalker's Guide to Dancing took Jacob 10 years to complete, during which time her father became sick and died. After his death, Jacob rewrote much of the book with the father character as her own father.

Jacob's second book, Good Talk, is a graphic memoir published in 2019. Good Talk was shortlisted for the National Book Critics Circle Award, long-listed for the PEN Open Book Award, and named a New York Times Notable Book. It was selected as a best book of the year by Time, Esquire, Publishers Weekly, and Library Journal. The memoir is currently in development as a television series with Film 44.

Personal life
Jacob was born and raised in New Mexico to parents who immigrated from India in 1968, the same year they were wed in an arranged marriage. Because there were so few Indian Americans in New Mexico, people often assumed she was Native American, she told Kirkus: "They all thought we were Hopi or Apache or Mexican." When Jacob was 20, her parents fell in love, she wrote in an essay for Vogue. Jacob wrote that their renewed relationship allowed her to form her own romantic relationship with filmmaker Jed Rothstein, whom she later married. 

She now lives in Brooklyn with Rothstein and their son.

Works

Good Talk: A Memoir in Conversations. Bloomsbury Publishing. 2019. .

References

External links 
 

1973 births
21st-century American novelists
21st-century American women writers
American women novelists
American women writers of Indian descent
Living people
Novelists from New Mexico
The New School alumni